Ben Kaye (born 19 December 1988) is an English rugby league footballer who last played as a  for the Batley Bulldogs in the Betfred Championship.

He played for the Leeds Rhinos and Harlequins RL in the Super League, and for Featherstone Rovers and Halifax in the Championship.

Background
Kaye was born in Morley, West Yorkshire, England. Kaye played junior rugby league for Churwell Chiefs ARLFC and played for England at under-16 level.

Career
He made a try scoring début against Harlequins RL in March 2008 when playing for Leeds.
After a spell in London with Harlequins RL Kaye headed back north to join Championship club Featherstone Rovers.
On 18 August 2020 it was reported that Kaye would join Batley for the 2021 season.

References

External links

Halifax profile
(archived by web.archive.org) Profile at featherstonerovers.net
Harlequins profile
(archived by web.archive.org) Leeds Rhinos profile

1988 births
Living people
Batley Bulldogs players
English rugby league players
Featherstone Rovers players
Halifax R.L.F.C. players
Leeds Rhinos players
London Broncos players
Rugby league hookers
Rugby league players from Leeds
Sportspeople from Morley, West Yorkshire